Skaratki pod Las  is a village in the administrative district of Gmina Domaniewice, within Łowicz County, Łódź Voivodeship, in central Poland.

The village has a population of 30.

References

Skaratki pod Las